Zach Pascal (born December 18, 1994) is an American football wide receiver who is a free agent. He played college football at Old Dominion.

Early years
Pascal attended and played high school football at Dr. Henry A. Wise Jr. High School. During his senior season, Pascal was named first-team all county and third-team all state.

College career
Pascal attended and played college football at Old Dominion from 2014–2016. In 2016, he helped lead Old Dominion to the Bahamas Bowl, their first bowl game in program history. During the game, he gained 78 yards and scored a touchdown in the victory against Eastern Michigan.

Collegiate statistics

Professional career

Washington Redskins
Pascal signed with the Washington Redskins as an undrafted free agent following the 2017 NFL Draft. He was waived by the Redskins on September 2, 2017.

Tennessee Titans
On September 4, 2017, Pascal was signed to the Tennessee Titans' practice squad. He was promoted to the active roster on September 20, 2017. He was waived on September 23, 2017 and was re-signed to the practice squad. He signed a reserve/future contract with the Titans on January 15, 2018. He was waived on June 14, 2018.

Indianapolis Colts

On June 15, 2018, Pascal was claimed off of waivers by the Indianapolis Colts.  He competed for a spot and made the 53 man roster. In the Colts' season opener against the Cincinnati Bengals, Pascal made it but he didn’t see much action totaling only 1 reception for 18 yards to go along with two kick returns for 54 net yards. On September 30, he scored his first NFL touchdown with a pass from Andrew Luck in an overtime loss to the Houston Texans. In the 2018 season, he had 27 receptions for 268 yards and two touchdowns. In the Divisional Round loss to the Kansas City Chiefs, Pascal scored a touchdown when he recovered a blocked punt in the endzone.

On October 20, 2019, in Week 7 against the Houston Texans, Pascal finished with 106 receiving yards and two touchdowns, marking the first time in his professional career with over 100 yards.
In Week 13 against the Tennessee Titans, Pascal caught seven passes for 109 yards in the 31–17 loss. On December 30, 2019, Pascal was signed to a one-year extension through 2020. Overall, Pascal finished the 2019 season with 41 receptions for 607 receiving yards and five receiving touchdowns.

In Week 15 of the 2020 season against the Houston Texans, Pascal recorded 5 catches for 79 yards and 2 touchdowns during the 27–20 win.

The Colts placed a second-round restricted free agent tender on Pascal on March 17, 2021. He signed the one-year contract on April 19.

Philadelphia Eagles
On March 21, 2022, Pascal signed a one-year contract with the Philadelphia Eagles, reuniting him with his former Colts offensive coordinator Nick Sirianni who is the Eagles head coach. He originally chose to wear No. 11, but switched to number 3 when the Eagles acquired A. J. Brown. Pascal reached Super Bowl LVII, but the Eagles lost 38-35 to the Kansas City Chiefs. In the Super Bowl, Pascal had 2 catches for 11 yards.

NFL career statistics

References

External links
Old Dominion Monarchs bio
Indianapolis Colts bio

1994 births
Living people
American football wide receivers
Indianapolis Colts players
Old Dominion Monarchs football players
People from Upper Marlboro, Maryland
Philadelphia Eagles players
Players of American football from Maryland
Sportspeople from the Washington metropolitan area
Tennessee Titans players
Washington Redskins players